The Ambassador of Australia to Italy is an officer of the Australian Department of Foreign Affairs and Trade and the head of the Embassy of the Commonwealth of Australia to the Republic of Italy in Rome.  The position has the rank and status of an Ambassador Extraordinary and Plenipotentiary and holds non-resident accreditation for Albania (1992–2004; since 3 July 2013), Libya (1978–1987; since 2002), and San Marino (since 1995). The Ambassador also serves as Australia's delegate to the UN Agencies in Rome as Permanent Representative to the Food and Agriculture Organization (since 1951) and as representative to the World Food Programme (since 1961).

The current ambassador, since July 2020, is Margaret Twomey.

Posting history
Australia and Italy have enjoyed diplomatic relations since November 1949, when a legation was established in Rome and the first Minister, C.V. Kellway presented his credentials to President Luigi Einaudi on 24 November 1949. On 4 January 1978 Australia established diplomatic relations with the Socialist People's Libyan Arab Jamahiriya, but relations were cut by Prime Minister Bob Hawke in May 1987 owing to the Gaddafi regime's "covert operations in the South Pacific". Relations were not restored until June 2002 and recognition was transferred after the Libyan Civil War on 9 June 2011 to the National Transitional Council. Although Australia has had diplomatic relations with Albania since 1985, accreditation has only been held by the Ambassador in Rome since 3 July 2013, when accreditation was transferred from the Embassy in Athens. The embassy in Rome had previously held accreditation to Albania from 1992 to 2004. Since 1968 the ambassador has been assisted by a consulate-general in Milan run by Austrade.

Officeholders

Heads of mission

Notes
 Also served as Permanent Representative to the Food and Agriculture Organization, since 1951.
 Also served as Representative to the World Food Programme, since 1961.
 Also non-resident ambassador to the State of Libya, 4 January 1978–May 1987, and since June 2002.
 Also non-resident ambassador to the Republic of Albania, 1992–2004, and since 3 July 2013.
 Also non-resident ambassador to the Republic of San Marino, since 1995.

Consuls-General in Milan

 : Named Consul.

References

External links
 Australian Embassy, Rome

 
 
 
 
Italy
Australia
Food and Agriculture Organization officials